Inquisivi is a province in the La Paz Department in Bolivia. During the presidency of José Ballivián it was created on November 2, 1844. The capital of the province is Inquisivi.

Geography 
The Kimsa Cruz mountain range traverses the province. Some of the highest mountains of the province are listed below:

Subdivision 
Inquisivi Province is divided into six municipalities which are further subdivided into cantons.

See also 
 Jach'a Jawira
 Laram Quta
 Wallatani Lake
 Watir Quta
 Waña Quta

References

External links
Inquisivi website (Spanish)
Population data (Spanish)

Provinces of La Paz Department (Bolivia)